Hugh McAteer (13 August 1916 – 24 June 1970) was a volunteer in, and leader of, the Irish Republican Army during their Northern Campaign, and later in 1950 and 1964 unsuccessfully contested for a seat in the British Parliament.

Biography 
A bookkeeper by profession, McAteer was from Derry. He served as IRA Chief of Staff from 1941 until 12 October 1942, when he was captured and arrested by the Royal Ulster Constabulary. He was later sentenced to 15 years imprisonment on the charge of treason. On 15 January 1943, along with three senior IRA men Patrick Donnelly, Ned Maguire and Jimmy Steele, he escaped over the wall from Crumlin Road Gaol, Belfast. On Easter Saturday, 24 April 1943, he participated in the Broadway Cinema operation on the Falls Road when armed IRA men took over the cinema, stopped the film, and went on stage and read a statement from the IRA Army Council and the Proclamation of the 1916 Easter Rising. The statement denounced the British military presence in Northern Ireland as an "invasion of our rights" and warned that they will be targeted in "a resumption of hostilities between the Irish Republic and Great Britain".

McAteer was subsequently rearrested. Along with other IRA prisoners, he was released in 1950.

In 1950, McAteer ran as a Sinn Féin candidate for the Londonderry constituency in the British general election on an independent republican abstentionist ticket. He polled 21,880 votes or 37.41%. (Other Republican candidates included Jimmy Steele (for West Belfast) and Liam Burke (for Mid Ulster). The three candidates polled 23,362 votes together but were not elected.) He also contested the 1964 British general election for the same constituency and on the same ticket, polling 21,123 votes (35.91%).

Family
McAteer was the third son of Hugh McAteer, a labourer, and Bridget Doherty. He was a brother of Eddie McAteer, leader of the Nationalist Party and Stormont MP.

Hugh McAteer's son, Aidan, was a personal assistant to Gerry Adams and onetime staff officer of the IRA's Belfast Brigade.

Hugh McAteer's grandson, Ronan McGinley, was elected as a Sinn Féin Councillor in 2014. He served as Mid Ulster Council Group Leader.

His many interests included Irish Traditional singing and he even provided the notes for an album entitled "Ireland Her Own" (Topic Records, 1967), recorded by two former IRA volunteers - Paddy Tunney and Arthur Kearney - who had been imprisoned with him in the Crumlin Road Gaol in the 1940s.

Death
McAleer died suddenly in Belfast on 24 June 1970. He is buried in Miltown Cemetery, Belfast.

References 

1916 births
1970 deaths
Politicians from Derry (city)
Irish Republican Army (1922–1969) members
Republicans imprisoned during the Northern Ireland conflict
Sinn Féin politicians
People convicted of treason against the United Kingdom